United Nations Security Council resolution 1138, adopted unanimously on 14 November 1997, after recalling all resolutions on the situation in Tajikistan and along the Tajik-Afghan border, the Council expanded and extended the mandate of the United Nations Mission of Observers in Tajikistan (UNMOT) until 15 May 1998.

The council observed further progress in the implementation of the peace agreement between the government of Tajikistan and the United Tajik Opposition (UTO), and the ceasefire was respected. The security situation remained precarious and there violence in the centre of the country, though other parts remained quiet.

The two parties in Tajikistan had made progress with regards to Commission on National Reconciliation, exchange of prisoners of war, the registration of UTO fights in Tajikistan, the repatriation of refugees to Afghanistan and the formation of a joint security unit to protect UNMOT personnel. All of these developments were welcomed by the council, which then expanded the UNMOT mandate to:

(a) co-operate in the election and referendum process;
(b) investigate report violations of the ceasefire;
(c) monitor the disarmament, demobilisation and reintegration of UTO troops;
(d) co-ordinate United Nations assistance to Tajikistan;
(e) maintain contacts with both parties, the Commonwealth of Independent States peacekeeping force and Organization for Security and Co-operation in Europe.

The intention of the Secretary-General Kofi Annan to convene a donor conference to provide funds for the operations in Tajikistan was welcomed. He was finally asked to report within three months on the implementation of the current resolution.

See also
 Civil war in Tajikistan
 History of Tajikistan
 List of United Nations Security Council Resolutions 1101 to 1200 (1997–1998)

References

External links
 
Text of the Resolution at undocs.org

 1138
1997 in Tajikistan
 1138
November 1997 events